Manoba banghaasi is a moth in the family Nolidae. It was described by West in 1929. It is found in Japan.

References

Moths described in 1929
Nolinae